TT3 is Theban Tomb 3, located in Deir el-Medina, Egypt, the tomb of Pashedu.

TT3 may also refer to:

 3 mm scale, also known as TT3, a model railway scale of 3 mm
Para table tennis Class 3
Third generation TransTrem, a guitar vibrato system 
Rabobank Development Team, a professional bicycle racing team, formerly Rabobank TT3

See also
TT3D: Closer to the Edge, documentary film about the Isle of Man TT motorcycle race